John Cecil McCormack (15 February 1922 – 1995) was an English footballer who played as a centre forward.

McCormack started his career with Gateshead, moving to neighbours Middlesbrough in April 1947 before a spell at non-league Chelmsford City. He signed for Barnsley in July 1950, spending just over a year there and setting a new club record for goals in a single season with 33. He moved to Notts County in November 1951. After 4 years at Notts County, McCormack played for non-league King's Lynn before joining Canadian side Polish White Eagles, based in Toronto.

References

1922 births
1995 deaths
English footballers
Association football forwards
Gateshead F.C. players
Middlesbrough F.C. players
Chelmsford City F.C. players
Barnsley F.C. players
Notts County F.C. players
King's Lynn F.C. players
English Football League players